The men's 200 metres event at the 2009 European Athletics U23 Championships was held in Kaunas, Lithuania, at S. Dariaus ir S. Girėno stadionas (Darius and Girėnas Stadium) on 17 and 18 July.

Medalists

Results

Final
18 July
Wind: -0.2 m/s

Semifinals
18 July
Qualified: first 4 each to Final

Semifinal 1

Semifinal 2
Wind: -0.7 m/s

Heats
17 July
Qualified: first 3 each heat and 4 best to Semifinals

Heat 1
Wind: -0.4 m/s

Heat 2

Heat 3
Wind: 0.1 m/s

Heat 4
Wind: 0.3 m/s

Participation
According to an unofficial count, 24 athletes from 16 countries participated in the event.

 (1)
 (1)
 (1)
 (3)
 (1)
 (1)
 (3)
 (1)
 (1)
 (1)
 (1)
 (2)
 (2)
 (1)
 (2)
 (2)

References

200 metres
200 metres at the European Athletics U23 Championships